Turneriprocris is a genus of moths in the family Zygaenidae. It contains only one species, Turneriprocris dolens, which is found in the Australian Capital Territory, New South Wales, Queensland, South Australia, Tasmania and Victoria.

The length of the forewings is 5.5–6.5 mm for males. Females are slightly larger. The head, thorax, abdomen and the upperside of the forewings are blackish brown with a bluish green sheen. The hindwings are black without sheen. Adults are on wing in early summer in one generation per year, although there are indications that a partial second generation may occur at some locations in autumn.

The larvae feed on Leptospermum myrsinoides and Leptospermum juniperinum.

References

Procridinae
Monotypic moth genera
Zygaenidae genera
Moths of Australia